Steve Vai is an American guitar player, songwriter and producer. He started his career in 1980 playing with Frank Zappa and has since recorded and toured with Alcatrazz, Whitesnake, David Lee Roth, and Public Image Ltd. Since 1983 Vai also released his own studio albums. His discography consists of eight studio albums, two EPs, two special albums, eight live albums, twelve soundtracks, twenty compilation albums and seven videos. Vai has been awarded three Grammy Awards and forty other awards. Vai has also appeared as a guest musician on forty-four albums, as diverse as Motörhead, M83, and most recently for the second time with Joe Jackson.

Albums

Studio albums

Live albums

Video albums

Soundtracks

Compilation albums

Other

As band member

Guest appearances

Other awards

See also 
 List of rock instrumentals
 Steve Vai songs

References

External links 

 Steve Vai's official homepage
 
 
 [ Billboard.com discography of Steve Vai]

Discographies of American artists
Rock music discographies